Dogu'a Tembien
 
Melfa is a tabiya or municipality in the Dogu'a Tembien district of the Tigray Region of Ethiopia and ancient capital of Tembien. The tabia centre is Melfa village itself, located approximately 3 km to the west of the woreda town Hagere Selam.

Geography 
The tabia stretches down from the ridge at 2700 m a.s.l. towards Zelekwa/Ruba Dirho River (2150 m a.s.l.).

Geology 
From the higher to the lower locations, the following geological formations are present:
 Upper basalt
 Interbedded lacustrine deposits  
 Lower basalt
 Amba Aradam Formation
 Antalo Limestone

Geomorphology and soils 
The main geomorphic unit is the Hagere Selam Highlands. Corresponding soil types are:
 Associated soil types 
 shallow soils with high stone contents (Skeletic Cambisol, Leptic Cambisol, Skeletic Regosol)
 moderately deep dark stony clays with good natural fertility (Vertic Cambisol)
 deep, dark cracking clays, temporarily waterlogged  during the wet season (Pellic Vertisol)
 Inclusions
 Rock outcrops and very shallow soils (Lithic Leptosol)
 Rock outcrops and very shallow soils on limestone (Calcaric Leptosol)
 Deep dark cracking clays with very good natural fertility, waterlogged during the wet season (Chromic Vertisol, Pellic Vertisol)
 Shallow stony dark loams on calcaric material (Calcaric Regosol, Calcaric Cambisol)
 Brown loamy soils on basalt with good natural fertility (Luvisol)

Springs 

As there are no permanent rivers, the presence of springs is of utmost importance for the local people. The following are the springs in the tabia:
 May Ayni in Maekhel Gaza
 Shafahambar in May Sa'iri
 May Dera in May Krawa

Reservoirs 
In this area with rains that last only for a couple of months per year, reservoirs of different sizes allow harvesting runoff from the rainy season for further use in the dry season. Overall they suffer from siltation. Yet, they strongly contribute to greening the landscape, either through irrigation or seepage water. In Melfa there is:
 Chini (reservoir), constructed in 1993
 Horoyo, household ponds, recently constructed through campaigns

Livelihood 
The population lives essentially from crop farming, supplemented with off-season work in nearby towns. The land is dominated by farmlands which are clearly demarcated and are cropped every year. Hence the agricultural system is a permanent upland farming system.

Melfa, and more precisely the May Sa'iri school is one of the first places in Ethiopia where Ecosan toilets were built.

Population 
The tabia centre of Melfa holds a few administrative offices and some small shops. The main other populated places in the tabia are:

Religion and church 
Most inhabitants are Orthodox Christians. Most important church in the tabia is Melfa Maryam.

History 

The history of the tabia is strongly confounded with the history of Tembien. As of the 19th Century, both oral traditions and written documents mention that the rulers of Tembien were based in Melfa.
Best known is Emperor Yohannes IV, born in Melfa, and whose forefathers had managed to gain power through marriage with all the surrounding ruling families. Kassa (the future emperor Yohannes) controlled the Tembien highlands and later the whole of Tigray; ultimately he crowned himself king of kings of Ethiopia in 1872. 
However, Emperor Yohannes IV did not establish his capital in Melfa (due to relative inaccessibility), but in Mekelle and Adwa - these towns were well connected to the Red Sea and to inner Ethiopia. Yet, Yohannes kept strong links with Tembien, as indicated by the establishment of a (locally paved) horse-track between Melfa and Mekelle.
In 1951, Gebru Gebrehiwot, the new governor, decided to create a new capital of Tembien. First the location of Melfa was chosen. As the inhabitants of Melfa rejected the idea, Hagere Selam was created as a new town. In the 1980s, the area became again a temporary capital in war-faring Ethiopia: the TPLF party established its HQ in a cave in nearby Mahbere Sillasie, whereas the EPDM used a cave in Melfa.

Roads and communication 
A rural access road links Melfa to the main asphalt road in Hagere Selam.

Schools 
Almost all children of the tabia are schooled, though in some schools there is lack of classrooms, directly related to the large intake in primary schools over the last decades. Schools in the tabia include May Sa'iri school.

Tourism 
Its mountainous nature and proximity to Mekelle makes the tabia fit for tourism.

Touristic attractions 
 Historic birthplace of Emperor Yohannes
 Headquarters (caves) of the Amhara liberation movement (Ethiopian People's Democratic Movement) during the Ethiopian civil war

Geotouristic sites 
The high variability of geological formations and the rugged topography invites for geological and geographic tourism or "geotourism". Geosites in the tabia include:

Trekking routes 
Trekking routes have been established in this tabia. The tracks are not marked on the ground but can be followed using downloaded .GPX files.
 Route 5 follows the upper ridge, north of Melfa
 Route 6 comes from Hagere Selam, and crosses Melfa diagonally towards the lower Ruba Dorho river
 Route 20 follows the Ruba Dorho and Zeleqwa rivers, at the southern side of Melfa

Inda Siwa, the local beer houses 
In the main villages, there are traditional beer houses (Inda Siwa), often in unique settings, which are a good place for resting and chatting with the local people. Most renown in the tabia are
 Medhin Kassa at Maekhel Gaza
 Tsedal Girmay at Maekhel Gaza	
 Gebregziabher Hagos at Maekhel Gaza

Accommodation and facilities 
The facilities are very basic.  One may be invited to spend the night in a rural homestead or ask permission to pitch a tent. Hotels are available in Hagere Selam and Mekelle.

More detailed information 
For more details on environment, agriculture, rural sociology, hydrology, ecology, culture, etc., see the overall page on the Dogu'a Tembien district.

Gallery

References 

Populated places in the Tigray Region